The Josiah Tobey House is a historic house located at 67 Oxbow Road in Falmouth, Massachusetts.

Description and history 
The 1-3/4 story wood-frame house was built in 1854 for Sandwich native Josiah Tobey, whose in-laws owned land in the area. The house is a locally distinctive example of Greek Revival styling, with a Doric porch under a wide and steep gable. The entry is located on the right side of the porch, and has been enclosed between two of the four columns. The two windows under the porch extend from floor to ceiling.

The house was added to the National Register of Historic Places on December 9, 1994.

See also
National Register of Historic Places listings in Barnstable County, Massachusetts

References

Houses in Barnstable County, Massachusetts
National Register of Historic Places in Barnstable County, Massachusetts
Houses on the National Register of Historic Places in Barnstable County, Massachusetts
Houses completed in 1854
Greek Revival houses in Massachusetts